Red Bull Arena, known during the UEFA Euro 2008 as the EM-Stadion Wals-Siezenheim  and during UEFA club football events as Stadion Salzburg, is a football stadium in Wals-Siezenheim, a municipality in the suburbs of Salzburg, Austria. It was officially opened in March 2003 and is the home ground of FC Red Bull Salzburg. Previously, the club played at Stadion Lehen.

History
It features four teams: FK Austria Wien, FC Rapid București, Maccabi Haifa F.C. and FC Shakhtar Donetsk. To which Shaktar was declared the champions.

Overview
Its current seating capacity is 30,188. The stadium's original capacity was 18,200, but it was heavily expanded to over 30,000 so as to accommodate the 2008 European Football Championships.

The "EM Stadion Wals-Siezenheim" was the only stadium in the Austrian Bundesliga which used artificial turf. Polytan's FIFA 2-Star Recommended 40mm surface Ligaturf with a 25mm elastic layer was installed in 2005, but since summer 2008 natural lawn has been used.

From the 2018-19 Austrian Football Bundesliga season onwards, the majority of the upper stand remains closed, therefore limiting capacity to 17,218. This was done in order to boost the often as „weak“ considered atmosphere during Salzburg‘s national home games. This reduction in capacity only applies for Bundesliga matches.

Euro 2008 Matches

References

External links

 Red Bull Arena (Salzburg)
 Stadium Guide Article

Buildings and structures in Salzburg
Red Bull
Salzburg-Umgebung District
Sports venues completed in 2003
UEFA Euro 2008 stadiums in Austria
FC Red Bull Salzburg
Football venues in Austria